Osman Manzanares (born 2 November 1965) is a Honduran weightlifter. He competed in the men's featherweight event at the 1992 Summer Olympics.

References

External links
 

1965 births
Living people
Honduran male weightlifters
Olympic weightlifters of Honduras
Weightlifters at the 1992 Summer Olympics
Place of birth missing (living people)